Ibadan is the capital and most populous city of Oyo State, in Nigeria. It is the third-largest city by population in Nigeria after Lagos and Kano, with a total population of 3,649,000 as of 2021, and over 6 million people within its metropolitan area. It is the country's largest city by geographical area. At the time of Nigeria's independence in 1960, Ibadan was the largest and most populous city in the country, and the second most populous in Africa behind Cairo. Ibadan is ranked the second fastest growing city on the African continent according to the UN Human settlements research  program (2022), It is also ranked third in West Africa in the tech startups index. Ibadan joined the UNESCO Global Network of Learning Cities in 2016.

It is a prominent transit point between the coastal region and areas in the hinterland of the country. Ibadan had been the administrative centre of the old Western Region since the early days of British colonial rule, and parts of the city's ancient protective walls still stand to this day. The principal inhabitants of the city are the Yoruba people, as well as various communities (notably Igbo, Hausa, Edo, and Ibibio) from other parts of the country.

History 

Ibadan, coined from the phrase "Eba Odan", which literally means 'by the edge of the meadow', came into existence in 1829, during a period of turmoil that characterized Yorubaland at the time. It was in this period that many old Yoruba cities such as old Oyo (Oyo ile), Ijaye and Owu disappeared, and newer ones such as Abeokuta, new Oyo (Oyo atiba) and Ibadan sprang up to replace them. According to local historians, Lagelu founded the city, and was initially intended to be a war camp for warriors coming from Oyo, Ife and Ijebu. As a forest site containing several ranges of hills, varying in elevation from 160 to 275 metres, the location of the camp offered strategic defence opportunities. Moreover, its location at the fringe of the forest (from which the city got its name) promoted its emergence as a marketing centre for traders and goods from both the forest and grassland areas.

In 1852, the Church Missionary Society sent David and Anna Hinderer to found a mission. They decided to build the mission and a church in Ibadan when they arrived in 1853.

Ibadan thus had initially begun as a military state and remained so until the last decade of the 19th century. The city-state also succeeded in building a large empire from the 1860s to the 1890s which extended over much of northern and eastern Yorubaland. It was appropriately nicknamed idi Ibon or “gun base”, because of its unique military character.

In Ibadan, unlike other Yoruba cities with traditional kingship institutions, the warrior class became the rulers of the city as well as the most important economic group.

Ibadan grew into an impressive and sprawling urban center, such that by the end of 1829 Ibadan dominated the Yorùbá region militarily, politically and economically. The military sanctuary expanded even further when refugees began arriving in large numbers from northern Oyo following raids by Fulani warriors. After losing the northern portion of their region to the marauding Fulanis, many Oyo indigenes retreated deeper into the Ibadan environs. The Fulani Caliphate attempted to expand further into the southern region of modern-day Nigeria, but was decisively defeated by the armies of Ibadan in 1840, which eventually halted their progress. The colonial period reinforced the position of the city in the Yoruba urban network. After a small boom in rubber business (1901-1913), cocoa became the main produce of the region and attracted European and Levantine firms, as well as southern and northern traders from Lagos, Ijebu-Ode and Kano among others. The city became a major point of bulk trade. Its central location and accessibility from the capital city of Lagos were major considerations in the choice of Ibadan as the headquarters of the Western Provinces (1939) which ranged from the northernmost areas of Oyo State to Ekeremor, Bomadi and Patani, which were regions transferred from the old Delta province in the Old Western region and later Mid-west to the old Rivers state and later Bayelsa, in the redistricting of Nigeria carried out by the Yakubu Gowon administration shortly before the Nigerian civil war.

Colonial Ibadan 
In 1893, the Ibadan area became a British Protectorate after a treaty signed by Fijabi, the Baale of Ibadan with the British acting Governor of Lagos Colony, George C. Denton on 15 August. By then, the population had swelled to 120,000. The British developed the new colony to facilitate their commercial activities in the area, and Ibadan shortly grew into the major trading center that it is today.

Geography 
It lies completely within the tropical forest zone but close to the boundary between the forest and the derived savanna. The city ranges in elevation from 150 m in the valley area, to 275 m above sea level on the major north–south ridge which crosses the central part of the city.

The city of Ibadan is naturally drained by four rivers with many tributaries: Ona River in the North and West; Ogbere River towards the East; Ogunpa River flowing through the city and Kudeti River in the Central part of the metropolis. Ogunpa River, a third-order stream with a channel length of 12.76 km and a catchment area of 54.92 km2. Lake Eleyele is located at the northwestern part of the city, while the Osun River and the Asejire Lake bounds the city to the east.

Climate 
Ibadan has a tropical wet and dry climate (Köppen climate classification Aw), with a lengthy wet season and relatively constant temperatures throughout the year. Ibadan's wet season runs from March through October, though August sees somewhat of a lull in precipitation. This lull divides the wet season into two different wet seasons. November to February forms the city's dry season, during which Ibadan experiences the typical West African harmattan. There are two peaks for rainfall, June and September.

Administration 
There are eleven (11) Local Governments in Ibadan Metropolitan area consisting of five urban local governments in the city and six semi-urban local governments in the less city. Local governments at present are institutions created by the military governments but recognised by the 1999 constitution and they are the third tiers of government in Nigeria. Local governments Councils consist of the Executive Arm made up of the Executive Chairman, the Vice chairman, the Secretary and the Supervisory Councilors.

Local government areas 
Ibadan Urban — LGA Chairman
 Ibadan North — Adebayo Adegoke
 Ibadan North-East — Lekan Afuye
 Ibadan North-West — Mojeed Bosun Ajuwon
 Ibadan South-East — Abimbola Omiyale
 Ibadan South-West — Adeleke Taoreed Bolaji
Ibadan Semi-Urban — LGA Chairman
 Akinyele — Taoreed Jimoh Adedigba
 Egbeda — Akeem Akintunde
 Ido — Sheriff Aderemi Adeojo
 Lagelu — Oyesanmi Toriola
 Ona Ara — Ogundele Biliaminu
 Oluyole —Ayodeji Abass Aleshinloye

Local Council Development Areas 
The former Executive Governor of Oyo State, Senator Isiaka Abiola Ajimobi, created some Local Council Development Areas (LCDAs) out of some of the existing local government areas in Oyo State. From the Ibadan Urban Local Government areas, the following LCDAs were created.
Out of Ibadan North Local Government area, Aare Latosa LCDA and Irepodun LCDA were created.
Out of Ibadan North East Local Government area, Ibadan East LCDA was created.
Out of Ibadan North West Local Government area, Oke'Badan North LCDA was created.
Out of Ibadan South East Local Government area, Ibadan South LCDA was created.
Out of Ibadan South West Local Government area, Ibadan West LCDA was created.

From the Ibadan Semi-urban Local Government areas, the following LCDAs were created.
Out of Akinyele Local Government area, Akinyele South LCDA and Akinyele East LCDA were created.

Demographics 
Until 1970, Ibadan was the largest city in Sub-Saharan Africa by surface area. In 1952, it was estimated that the total area of the city was approximately 103.8 km2 However, only 36.2 km2 was built up. This meant that the remaining 67 km2 were devoted to non-urban uses, such as farmlands, river floodplains, forest reserves and water bodies. These “non-urban land uses” disappeared in the 1960s: an aerial photograph in 1973 revealed that the urban landscape had completely spread over about 100 km2. The land area increased from 136 km2 in 1981 to 210–240 km2 in 1988-89 (Areola, 1994: 101). By 2000, it is estimated that Ibadan covered 400 km2. The growth of the built-up area during the second half of the 20th century (from 40 km2 in the 1950s to 250 km2 in the 1990s) shows clearly that there has been an underestimate of the total growth of the city. In the 1980s, the Ibadan-Lagos expressway generated the greatest urban sprawl (east and north of the city), followed by the Eleiyele expressway (west of the city). Since then, Ibadan city has spread further into the neighbouring local government areas of Akinyele and Egbeda in particular.

Places of worship 
Among the places of worship, there are Christian churches and temples: Church of Nigeria (Anglican Communion), Presbyterian Church of Nigeria (World Communion of Reformed Churches), Nigerian Baptist Convention (Baptist World Alliance), Living Faith Church Worldwide, Redeemed Christian Church of God,The Covenant Nation, Assemblies of God, Seventh-day Adventist Church, Roman Catholic Archdiocese of Ibadan (Catholic Church), some Pentecostal churches, and Muslim mosques.

Architecture 
The best method to move about the city is to use reference points and notable landmarks.

Dugbe district is the commercial nerve centre of Ibadan. This is where many banks have one or more branches. The south west regional office of the Central Bank of Nigeria is at Dugbe. Also at Dugbe is the Cocoa House, Nigeria's first skyscraper.

It is one of the few skyscrapers in the city and is at the hub of Ibadan's commercial centre. The Cocoa house is the headquarters for the Oodua Investment Company co-owned by all south-western states. Other tall buildings around Dugbe axis include Femi Johnson glass house, CBN building, United Bank for Africa, Oxford building, Federal Radio Corporation of Nigeria's Building, among others.

There is a museum in the building of the Institute of African Studies, which exhibits several remarkable pre-historic bronze carvings and statues. The city has several well stocked libraries, and is home to the first television station in Africa. The city has two zoological gardens, one located within the University of Ibadan and another at Agodi Gardens which also contains a botanical garden, swimming pool and leisure spots.

The Bower's Tower, built in 1936, is to the east on Oke Aàre (Aare's Hill) ("Aare" in Yoruba means commander-in-chief or generalissimo), which can be seen from practically any point in the city; it also provides an excellent view of the whole city from the top. It is named after Robert Lister Bower, and is sometimes called "Láyípo"- a testament to the spiral staircase in the monument.  Other attractions include Mapo Hall  – the colonial style city hall – perched on top of a hill, "Oke Mapo," Mapo Hill ("oke" is hill in Yoruba), the Trans-Wonderland amusement park, the cultural centre Mokola and the Obafemi Awolowo Stadium (formerly Liberty Stadium). The first citadel of higher learning, University of Ibadan (formerly the University College of Ibadan), the Obafemi Awolowo Hall in the University of Ibadan is said to be one of the tallest and largest hostel in West Africa. The first teaching hospital in Nigeria, University College Hospital, were both built in this ancient city. Ibadan is also home to the Shooting Stars FC – a professional Football Club also known as 3SC.

There are some good golf courses: the Ibadan Golf Club is a large 18-hole challenge and the Barracks course has just been extended to 18 holes. The most challenging and exclusive is the 9-hole IITA Golf Club based on the 1,000 hectare premises of IITA.

Education 

Ibadan is host to Nigeria's premier higher institution of learning, The University of Ibadan. Established as a college of the University of London in 1948, and later converted into an autonomous university in 1962. Other higher educational institutions in the city include; The Polytechnic, Ibadan, Lead City University, Koladaisi University, Federal college of Animal health and Production Technology, Federal College of Forestry, Highland College of Technology, Samonda, Federal School of Statistics, Federal Cooperative College, Tower Polytechnic, Ibadan, Ibadan City Polytechnic, Citigate Polytechnic, NIIT University among others.

There are also numerous public and private primary and secondary schools located in the city and its suburbs. Other noteworthy institutions in the city include The University College Hospital, Ibadan (UCH), which is the first teaching hospital in Nigeria; the internationally acclaimed International Institute of Tropical Agriculture (IITA) headquartered in the city. Established in 1967, it focuses on the agricultural and developmental needs of tropical countries, with several research stations spread across Africa. The Nigerian Institute of Social and Economic Research (NISER), The Cocoa Research Institute of Nigeria, The National Root Crops Research Institute, and The Institute of Agricultural Research and Training (IAR&T), The Forestry Research Institute of Nigeria, the Nigerian Horticultural Research Institute (NIHORT), all under the auspices of The Agricultural Research Council of Nigeria.

In 1853, the first Europeans to settle in Ibadan, Reverend David and Anna Hinderer, started Ibadan's first Western schools. They built churches and Anna taught at the new school. They built the first two-storey building in Ibadan, which can still be found today at Kudeti. The first pupils to attend an elementary school in Ibadan were Yejide Olunloyo (female) and Akinyele Olunloyo (male) – the two children of an Ibadan high chief.

Economy 
Ibadan is the capital city of Oyo State, the fourth largest state economy in Nigeria, and the second largest non-oil state economy in Nigeria after Lagos state. With its strategic location on the railway line connecting Lagos to Kano, the city is a major center for trade in cassava, cocoa, cotton, timber, rubber, and palm oil. The city and its environs is home to several industries such as Agro allied, Textile, Food processing, Health Care and Cosmetic, Tobacco processing and Cigarette manufacturing, Leatherworks and furniture making Etc. There is abundance of clay, kaolin and aquamarine in the city environs, and there are several cattle ranches, a dairy farm as well as a commercial abattoir in Ibadan. There are dozens of banks and Insurance firms spread out across the cityscape that service the city's millions of inhabitants.

The main economic activities engaged in by the Ibadan populace include Agriculture, Trade, Public service employment, Factory work, Service sector/Tertiary production, Etc. The headquarters of the International Institute of Tropical Agriculture (IITA) have extensive grounds for crop and agricultural research into key tropical crops such as bananas, plantains, maize, cassava, soybean, cowpea and yam. According to a report, Ibadan is the 3rd cheapest Nigerian city to live in.

Entertainment and recreation 
Ibadan is a busy city but also accommodates an adequate amount of entertainment and relaxation. There are numerous bars, lounges and night clubs to enjoy, including the Lebanese owned "KOKO Dome" which is the oldest night club in the city dating back to the mid 90s.

Shopping, Cinema and Parks 

The Heritage Mall and Cocoa Mall houses several local and international retail stores. The two malls were built to interlink with each other and located in the same compound as Cocoa House at Dugbe. The 2 malls contain a South African retail shop; Shoprite, Pep Store (kids wears and boutique) several cafés, restaurants, electronic outlets, Mr. Price, Cash n Carry.
There is also the Palms Mall at Ring Road which houses one of the largest Shoprite store in Nigeria. There is another mall which opened not too far from the Central Business District called the Jericho Mall Kudeti Avenue, Onireke GRA. The top cinema chain in Nigeria, Filmhouse has 2 cinemas at the Heritage Mall Dugbe and another of its branch operate at the Ventura Mall, Samonda.

Sports and recreation 

There are various sport centres and facilities within the city limits of Ibadan. The Ibadan recreational club established 1902 in the Sabo area of the city is one of the oldest of such clubs in the country. It offers a swimming pool, tennis courts, basketball courts, snooker, squash courts, darts corner, and a relaxation bar. The city is also host to dozens of football academies where soccer talents are groomed. The Agodi Gardens of Oyo State has been completely refurbished to contain a Botanical Garden, Zoo, Swimming pool, Guest house, Bar and Restaurants. In addition, there are the Ibadan Polo Club at Eleyele and the Ibadan Golf Club in the Onireke reservation Area.

The city has the first standard Nigerian stadium, The Obafemi Awolowo Stadium formerly Liberty Stadium as well as The Lekan Salami Stadium which is the home of 3SC, Shooting stars football club, the team that won Nigeria's first international trophy, The African Cup Winners' Cup in 1976 by defeating Tonnerre Yaoundé of Cameroon 4 - 2 on aggregate points.

Public spaces and parks

 Trans Amusement park
 Fun factory
Agodi Gardens and Leisure Park
 Heritage Mall
 Ibadan recreational park
 Heritage & Cocoa Mall
 The Palms Mall
 Ventura Mall and Indoor park
The University of Ibadan Zoo
Game World, Dugbe, Ibadan
 Aces Mall, Bodija, Ibadan

Transport 

The city of Ibadan is a major Nigerian transport hub with freeways linking it with Lagos in the South South West, Ijebu Ode and Shagamu in the South, Abeokuta in the West, Oyo, ogbomosho, Offa and Ilorin in the North, Ife, Ado Ekiti, Osogbo, Ilesha, Akure, Okene, Auchi and other cities towards the East. The city is also served by an airport, the Ibadan Airport, which operates daily flights to Abuja, Lagos, Kano, Ilorin etc. through major airlines in Nigeria such as Overland Airways and Arik Air. The city is a major terminus railway station on the main railway line linking Lagos with Kano in the North of the country. Nearly all the major roads are dualized (Double carriage roads), such roads include the Ojoo-Sango-Mokola road that passes in front of the University of Ibadan, others include Ring road-Orita-Challenge-New Garage ways and the recently completed Dugbe-Eleyele-Jerico Road. There are various roundabouts, intersections and flyovers within the city, the latest being the Mokola flyover built to reduce persistent traffic gridlock being experienced in the Mokola axis of the city.

Modes of transport include, cabs & taxis, taxi-vans commonly called Danfos, and in more recent times mass transit buses have commenced operations to reduce the hardship of students and workers commuting from various suburban areas to the city center, private/personal/family cars, scooters commonly known as Okadas, Coach (bus) services, more commonly known locally as "luxurious busses"  such as Alakowe Bus, ABC Transport, Cross Country ltd Etc., which operate To and Fro services linking Ibadan and all other major destinations in the country and beyond, as well as pedestrian walking.

Since 2021, there is a new railway connection (standard gauge), which brings passengers to Lagos in less than 3 hours. It leaves at 8:00 and 16:00 every day (on time). The new railway line came with a new railway station.

Media 

The city host the first T.V station in Africa NTA, Ibadan established as Western Nigeria Television (WNTV) in 1959. The oldest surviving Nigeria newspaper is in Ibadan Tribune founded by chief Obafemi Awolowo Premier of Western Nigeria. The first private TV station Galaxy TV in Oyo State also started in the city. As at 2014 the city is home to several media outlets including
Nigerian Television Authority Ibadan Network Centre
Galaxy TV
B.C.O.S Broadcasting Corporation of Oyo State which also runs the radio services of B.C.O.S radio 1, Oluyole FM 98.5)
MITV Ibadan
Silverbird TV
Channels TV
AIT Africa Independent Television
Satellite channels are provided by
Multichoice Africa owner of DStv and GOTV satellite company has an office in the Jericho area of the city providing subscribers with numerous international and local TV and radio.
 Star times
 DaarSat

The radio stations in Ibadan are increasing in number compared to 5–10 years ago, when only 3 operated.
Today, there are:
B.C.O.S Radio 1 and Oluyole FM 98.5
Premier FM 93.5 (Federal Government Owned)
Amuludun FM 99.1(Yoruba only, Federal Government Owned)
Beat FM 97.9
Mitv/Star FM 95.1
Raypower Radio of AIT
Diamond FM 101.1 of University of Ibadan
Impact Business Radio (IBR 92.5 FM) a.k.a. Amutajero
Splash FM 105.5
Inspiration FM 100.5
Space FM 90.10
Naija FM 102.7
Royal Roots (R2)FM 92.9
Petals FM 102.3
Lagelu FM 96.3
Fresh FM 105.9
Star FM 91.5
Jamz FM 101.1
Thirty-Two FM 94.9
 Noble 107.1 FM
 Lead Radio FM 106.3
Pensioners' FM 106.7
Agidigbo FM 88.7
Solutions FM 93.9

There are also online communities of Ibadan residents such as CONNECTIBADAN, Ibadan247, IBpulse and WhatsupIbadan. They help the public connect with news, event and people in Ibadan and Oyo State as a whole.

Notable people 

 Adegoke Adelabu,old Western region politician
 Aminatu Abiodun, 14th Iyalode of Ibadan
 Victor Adeboyejo, British Championship League footballer
 Lamidi Adedibu
 Wally Adeyemo, U.S. government official 
 Sade Adu, singer
 Humuani Alaga, activist, indigenous textile entrepreneur
 Yetide Badaki, actress
 Kingsley Chioma
 Ken Goldberg, inventor
 KSI, British YouTuber, boxer, co-founder of Prime (by descent of his father)
 Hugo Weaving, actor

Twin towns – sister cities

Ibadan is twinned with:
 Cleveland, United States

Gallery

See also 
 Railway stations in Nigeria
 List of Nigerian cities by population

References

Sources
 'On Education' - Page 69; 'Seventeen Years in the Yoruba Country: Memorials of Anna Hinderer (wife of the Rev. David Hinderer, C.M.S. Missionary in Western Africa).
https://oyoaffairs.net/un-research-ranks-ibadan-as-2nd-fastest-growing-city-in-2022/

Bibliography

External links 

 

 
Cities in Nigeria
Cities in Yorubaland
Populated places established in 1829
Populated places in Oyo State
State capitals in Nigeria
1829 establishments in Africa
1893 establishments in the British Empire